Mox or MOX may refer to:

 Mox-Linde Gases, a Malaysian manufacturer of industrial gases
 Mixed oxide fuel, used in nuclear power plants
 Power Nine § Moxes, a type of card in the Power Nine group of Magic: The Gathering cards
 The quarterback played by James Vanderbeek in Varsity Blues (film)
 MOX (Mobitex Area Exchange), a node of the Mobitex cellular network standard
 Morris Municipal Airport, Minnesota, United States 
 A 1933 novel in The Shadow pulp fiction series
 A nickname of wrestler Jonathan Good, performing as Jon Moxley
 Microsoft Open XML, a file format 
 Mox Peaks, mountains in Washington State, United States 
 A music workstation synthesiser in the Yamaha Motif series 
 Mox McQuery (1861–1900), baseball player